Aryankuzhi Devi Temple is a famous devi temple located at Aryankuzhi, Trivandrum district, Kerala, 
India.

Legend

The legend says that, when a few children were playing, one of them fell down hitting on a sedimentary rock. Soon after that, the rock started bleeding. Astrological observations confirmed the presence of divinity in the stone and the people around the area started worshiping the rock which eventually turned out to a famous temple in southern Kerala.

Deities and sub-deities

Aryankuzhi Devi Temple enshrines a Swayambhu (self originated) Panchaloha idol of Goddess Parvati – a manifestation of Goddess Shakti.

The main upadevathas on the premises are
 Lord Ganesh
 Nagaraja
 Brahmarakshassu
 Maadan Thampuran
 Yakshi Amma

Important Months 
 Kanni - Navarathri aghosham is a famous festival, which attracts large number of devotees. On Vijayadasami day of the Navarathri utsavam, Vidyarambham is conducted.
 Vrishchikam - The Vrishchicka Mandala mahotsavam (festival) is celebrated during the entire period of mandalam season.
 Meenam - The annual festival of the temple comes in Meenam. It begins with inviting and placing  Bhagawathy in pacha panthal(Hut made of green palm leaves). Ooroottu is the major festival celebrated at Mukkolakkal Bhagavathy Temple annually. Also known as Ooroottu Maholtsavam, the festival starts on the Thiruonam nakshatra in the Malayalam month of Meenam. Parakkezhunnallippu (Ezhunallippu or Royal Procession of the deity atop an elephant), Pongala, Kuthiyottam, traditional music and dance programs, and colourful fireworks held at the temple premises are major attractions of the Mukkolackal Temple festival.
 Medam -  Vishu festival.
 Karkidakam - Aadi chovva festival.

Temple timings 
Aryankuzhi Devi Temple opens daily at 4:45 AM for Palliyunarthal ceremony and closes at 8:00 PM after Athazha Pooja and Deeparadhana. The worship timings are from 4:45 AM to 10:35 AM and from 5:00 PM to 8:00 PM. On Tuesdays and Fridays, the temple closes at 8:30 PM after special Pooja offerings.

References

Hindu temples in Thiruvananthapuram district
Devi temples in Kerala